Giuliano de' Medici (died 1635) was a Roman Catholic prelate who served as Archbishop of Pisa (1620–1635).

Biography
On 15 June 1620, Giuliano de' Medici was appointed during the papacy of Pope Paul V as Archbishop of Pisa.
On 21 June 1620, he was consecrated bishop by Roberto Ubaldini, Bishop of Montepulciano, with Francesco Sacrati, Titular Archbishop of Damascus, and Marsilio Peruzzi, Archbishop of Chieti, serving as co-consecrators. 
He served as Archbishop of Pisa until his death on 6 January 1635.

References

External links and additional sources
 (for Chronology of Bishops) 
 (for Chronology of Bishops) 

17th-century Roman Catholic archbishops in the Kingdom of Naples
Bishops appointed by Pope Paul V
1635 deaths